I Know My First Name Is Steven is a 1989 American television miniseries about kidnap victim Steven Stayner. The two-part miniseries was first broadcast by NBC on May 22 and 23, 1989. Screening rights were sold to a number of international television companies including the BBC, which screened the miniseries in mid-July of the following year; later still, it was released as a feature-length movie.
It was nominated as Best Miniseries or Television Film at the 47th Golden Globe Awards and received four Emmy Award nominations.

Plot 
Steven Stayner, a seven-year-old boy, is kidnapped by Kenneth Parnell, with the help of his partner in crime, Irving Murphy. Parnell continues to molest and produce pornographic images of Steven for seven years.

When Steven is 14, Parnell kidnaps a boy named Timmy. As a result, Steven builds up the courage to prevent Timmy from going through the same thing that he went through when he was Timmy's age. He brings Timmy to the police and confesses that he was the victim of a kidnapping by his "dad", Parnell.

Steven later testifies in court on Timmy's behalf, and then later, in a hearing for the crimes Parnell committed against Steven. Parnell spends five years of a seven-year sentence in prison for the kidnapping and sexual abuse against Steven, while his accomplice Murphy spends less than two years in prison.

Cast 
 Cindy Pickett – Kay Stayner
 John Ashton – Del Stayner
 Todd Eric Andrews – Cary Stayner
 Corin Nemec – Steven Stayner / Dennis Parnell
 Luke Edwards – Steven Stayner (age 7)
 Pruitt Taylor Vince – Irving Murphy
 Ray Walston – Bob Augustine
 Bryan Cranston — Officer Dickinson
 Gregg Henry – Officer Kean
 Jim Haynie – Officer Scott
 Barbara Tarbuck – School Counselor
 Scott Curtis – Cary Stayner (age 11)
 Arliss Howard – Kenneth Parnell (uncredited)
 Stephen Dorff – Pete
 Beth Grant – Mrs. Beta

Ratings

References

External links 

1989 American television series debuts
1989 American television series endings
1980s American drama television series
1980s American television miniseries
NBC network original films
English-language television shows
Television series by Lorimar Television
Television series by Warner Bros. Television Studios
Films directed by Larry Elikann